Anatole and the Cat is a 1957 picture book written by Eve Titus and illustrated by Paul Galdone. The book tells the story of a mouse who secretly works at a cheese factory and what happens when the owner brings a cat to the factory. The book was a recipient of a 1958 Caldecott Honor for its illustrations.

Plot
Anatole is the happiest, most contented mouse in all of Paris. He is Vice-President in charge of Cheese Tasting at Duvall’s cheese factory. He works in secret at night–the people at Duvall have no idea their mysterious taster is really a mouse! So M’sieu Duvall thinks nothing of bringing his pet cat to the factory…

Clever Anatole must act to protect his job and his life! He must do what no mouse has done before–find a way to bell the cat. Bonne chance, Anatole!

References

1957 children's books
American children's books
American picture books
Caldecott Honor-winning works
Children's books adapted into television shows
English-language books
Books about mice and rats
Books about cats